Danko may refer to:

Danko (surname)
Danko (given name)
Danko, Nigeria, part of Wasagu/Danko Local Government Area
Danko Jones, a Canadian hard rock band
Danko-Tanzou, a village in Burkina Faso